Cunduacán is a municipality in the central portion of the state of Tabasco, in Mexico. It is located at about 18°4'0"North, 93°10'0"West.

It is located in the Grijalva River Region, Chontalpa subregion. Its name originates from the Mayan cum-ua-cán, which means "place of corn and serpents", which is also the name of the city which is the municipal seat of the municipality. It is made up of 10 villages, 31 ranches (rancherías), 59 ejidos and 13 colonias. The town had a 2005 census population of 81,392 inhabitants (the sixth-largest community in the state after Villahermosa, Cárdenas, and Comalcalco, Huimangillo, and Macuspana), while the municipality had a population of 112,036  (www.inegi.gob.mx). To the North are the municipalities of Comalcalco and Jalpa de Méndez, to the East are the municipalities of Nacajuca and Centro, to the South is the municipality of Centro and the State of Chiapas, and to the West is the municipality of Cárdenas. Geophysically the municipality is completely flat, as it is part of the coastal plain. Its hydrography consists of the rivers Mezcalapa, which marks its southern border with the municipalities of Centro, Samaria, Guayabal, Cucuyulapa, Barí, Cunduacán and Tular; and the lagoons of Cucuyulapa and Ballona. The state's Universidad Juarez Autonoma de Tabasco has various centers in Cunduacán.

External links
Official site of the municipality
Enciclopedia de Municipios de Mexico – Estado de Tabasco – Cunduacán
Portal Oficial del Municipio de Cunduacán, Tabasco, México

Municipalities of Tabasco
Populated places in Tabasco